The Carlos Palanca Memorial Awards for Literature winners in the year 1972 (rank, title of winning entry, name of author).


English division
Short story
First prize: "The Tomato Game" by N.V.M. Gonzales
Second prize: "The Apollo Centennial" by Gregorio Brillantes
Third prize: "After This, Our Exile" by Elsa M. Coscolluela

Poetry
First prize: "Batik Maker and Other Poems" by Virginia Moreno
Second prize: "The Edge of the Wind" by Artemio Tadena
Third prize: "Tinikling (A Sheaf of Poems)" by Federico Licsi Espino Jr.

One-act play
First prize: "Grave for Blue Flowers" by Jesus T. Peralta
Second prize: "The Undiscovered Country" by Manuel M. Martell
Third prize: "The Renegade" by Elsa M. Coscolluela and "Now is the Time for All Good Men to Come to the Aid of their Country" by Julian E. Dacanay Jr.

Filipino (Tagalog) division
Short story in Filipino
First prize: "Si Loleng Marya Kapra, Mga Araw at Gabi at ang Bukang Liwayway sa Kanyang Buhay" by Wilfredo Pa. Virtusio
Second prize: "Kumpisal" by Norma Miraflor
Third prize: "Sandaang Damit" by Fanny A. Garcia

Poetry in Filipino
Special prizes:
 "1 Mayo 1971 at Iba Pang Tula" by Epifanio San Juan Jr.
 "20 Tula" by Lamberto E. Antonio
 "Bagong Balintawak" by Celestino M. Vega
 "Caloocan: Balada ng Duguang Tinig" by Ruth Elynia S. Mabanglo
 "Katipunan ng Napapanahong Mga Tula" by Teo S. Baylen
 "Sitsit sa Kuliglig" by Rolando S. Tinio

One-act play in Filipino
First prize: "Ang Unang Pagtatanghal ng 'Ang Huling Pasyon ni Hermano Pule'" by Rosauro Dela Cruz
Second prize: "Ang Katwiran ay Katwiran" by Rolando S. Tinio
Third prize: "Kumbensiyon ng mga Halimaw" by Rey Dela Cruz

References
 

1972
1972 literary awards